Brian E. Paul is a computer programmer who originally wrote and maintained the source code for the open source Mesa graphics library until 2012, and is still active in the project. He began writing its source code in August 1993. Mesa is a free software/open source graphics library that provides a generic OpenGL implementation for rendering three-dimensional graphics on multiple platforms.

Education 
Paul obtained his bachelor's degree at the University of Wisconsin–Oshkosh in 1990. He worked on the SSEC Visualization Project while obtaining his master's degree at the University of Wisconsin–Madison.

Mesa development 
Paul was a graphics hobbyist. He thought it would be fun to implement a simple 3D graphics library using the OpenGL API, which he might then use instead of VOGL. He spent eighteen months of part-time development before he released the software on the Internet. The software was well received, and people began contributing to its development. Graphics hardware support was added to Mesa in 1997 in the form of a Glide driver for the new 3dfx Voodoo graphics card.

Career 
Paul continued working on the SSEC Project after graduation. He has also worked for Silicon Graphics, Avid Technology, and Precision Insight (bought out by VA Linux Systems).

In 2000, Paul won the third Free Software Foundation Award for the Advancement of Free Software.

In November 2001, he co-founded Tungsten Graphics, which was acquired by VMware in December 2008, where he now works.

Other contributions 

Paul has also contributed to or written:

 Chromium
 Direct Rendering Infrastructure in XFree86
 Blockbuster – a high-res movie player for scientific visualization applications
 Glean – OpenGL validation
 Togl – an OpenGL widget for Tcl/Tk
 Vis5D visualization system
 VisAD visualization system
 Cave5D – an adaptation of Vis5D to immersive virtual reality
 TR – OpenGL tile rendering library
 V-Blocks – virtual building blocks
 Avid Marquee – video animation, 3D text, graphics

References

External links 
 Brian Paul's Home Page
 "Interview: Brian Paul Answers"; slashdot; December 17, 1999; Retrieved February 11, 2007

Free software programmers
Living people
Year of birth missing (living people)
University of Wisconsin–Oshkosh alumni
University of Wisconsin–Madison alumni